County Route 571 (CR 571) is a county highway in the U.S. state of New Jersey. The highway extends  from Route 37 in Toms River Township to Route 27 in Princeton. Though it is designated a north–south county route by the New Jersey Department of Transportation (NJDOT), it is signed both as north–south and east–west inconsistently.

Route description

Ocean and Monmouth counties
CR 571 begins at an intersection with Route 37 in Toms River, Ocean County, heading north on four-lane divided Fischer Boulevard concurrent with CR 549 Spur. The road continues north through business areas, with the median turning into a center left-turn lane. The routes turn northwest through residential and commercial areas along with some marshland from the adjacent Barnegat Bay to the east, with alternating segments of median and center left-turn lane. CR 571 splits from CR 549 Spur by heading west onto two-lane undivided Bay Avenue into areas of homes. The road intersects CR 627 before turning more to the northwest and becoming four lanes at the CR 22 junction. The route widens into a divided highway as it passes between the Ocean County Mall to the north and the Seacourt Pavilion shopping center to the south and intersects CR 549 at an at-grade cloverleaf interchange. After this, CR 571 becomes Bey Lea Road and becomes undivided again as it passes through more wooded areas of development, with the northbound direction narrowing to one lane at the CR 18 junction as it turns west. After crossing CR 623, the road becomes three lanes, with two westbound lanes and one eastbound lane, as it heads northwest past more businesses on Indian Head Road. The route runs west near a few homes before passing under the Garden State Parkway and reaching the U.S. Route 9 (US 9) junction.

CR 571 becomes four lanes at this point and passes residences to the north and a shopping center to the south prior to intersecting CR 527. CR 571 turns northwest to join CR 527 on Whitesville Road, passing wooded areas of housing developments. CR 527 splits from CR 571 by turning north, and CR 571 continues northwest along Toms River Road, entering Manchester Township. The road continues through forested development as it comes to the Route 70 junction. At this point, the route narrows to two lanes and passes through more wooded areas with occasional residences, crossing the Southern Secondary railroad line operated by the Delaware and Raritan River Railroad. CR 571 crosses CR 547 before heading into Jackson Township. The route runs through forested areas of the Pine Barrens with intermittent residential development for several miles, eventually turning north and coming to the junction with CR 528 in the community of Cassville. The road becomes Cassville Road at this intersection and passes Cassville Lake as it comes to the CR 638 intersection. CR 571 continues north past more wooded areas of homes before coming to an intersection with CR 526. At this point, CR 526 turns north to form a concurrency with CR 571 and the two routes continue through forests on Trenton-Lakewood Road, passing under Interstate 195 (I-195) prior to coming to the CR 537 junction.

 At the CR 537 intersection, CR 526/CR 571 continues into Millstone Township in Monmouth County and continues northwest through more forested areas of homes before CR 526 splits from CR 571 by heading west. CR 571 heads north along Millstone Road and comes to the junction with CR 524. Here, the route turns west to join CR 524 on Stage Coach Road, making a turn to the north at an intersection with Red Valley Road/Spring Road. The routes make a sharp turn to the southwest before CR 571 splits from CR 524 by heading north on Rising Sun Tavern Road. The route runs through forests with some homes and farms, curving to the northwest and entering Roosevelt, where it becomes Clarksburg Road and continues through wooded areas with some homes. CR 571 turns north onto South Rochdale Avenue and passes more residences. The route crosses back into Millstone Township and heads into areas of farmland and woodland, turning northwest at the CR 1 junction.

Mercer County

CR 571 enters East Windsor Township in Mercer County and becomes Etra Road in the community of Etra, as it continues through a mix of farms, woods, and homes. The route turns north before curving northwest near Etra Lake and passing over the New Jersey Turnpike (I-95). The road heads west into Hightstown and passes homes before reaching an intersection with CR 539. CR 571 turns north to follow CR 539 on South Main Street at this point. Upon reaching the commercial downtown of Hightstown, northbound CR 539/CR 571 join Route 33 as it merges from Mercer Street onto Main Street. Traveling southbound, CR 539/571 follow Route 33 onto Mercer Street for one block before turning east onto Ward Street and then south onto South Main Street; those wanting to travel west onto Route 33 from northbound CR 539/571 must also use Ward Street. CR 571 then leaves the concurrency by turning to the west on Stockton Street. The route passes more residences, the Stockton Street Historic District, before crossing back into East Windsor Township and intersecting US 130. The road heads northwest and becomes Hightstown Road at this point and passes through commercial areas with a few farms, widening to four lanes just before the junction with the western terminus of Route 133. A short distance later, CR 571 crosses CR 535 and heads west into West Windsor Township, passing through a mix of farmland, woodland, and residences. The road enters areas of residential subdivisions after it crosses Southfield Road, crosses Bear Brook, and then turns northwest as it comes to another junction with CR 526.

At this point, CR 526 forms a signed (but not officially designated) concurrency with CR 571 for the remainder of the route, with the road intersecting CR 607 prior to crossing CR 638. The route narrows to two lanes and turns north at this point, passing a mix of homes and businesses as it reaches the CR 615 junction. At this point, CR 571 becomes part of the state-maintained Route 64, a two-lane divided highway that carries the route over Amtrak's Northeast Corridor near the Princeton Junction Station at West Windsor. Past the terminus of Route 64, CR 571 continues northwest on two-lane undivided Washington Road, passing through wooded residential areas before intersecting US 1 at the modified Penns Neck Circle. Past the intersection, the road runs through the historic Washington Road Elm Allée, rows of Princeton elm trees that line both sides of the road. The road descends a hill before crossing the Delaware and Raritan Canal and Lake Carnegie into Princeton. At this point, CR 571 runs through the heart of the Princeton University campus, reaching its northern terminus at Route 27 (Nassau Street).

History

From Hightstown to Millstone Township, the road was built by the Hightstown and Perrineville Turnpike Company, chartered in 1859. Their road also extended east along what is now Perrineville Road.

When it was first designated in the early 1950s, CR 571 ran entirely in Ocean County from then-Dover Township to CR 526 in Jackson Township. The modern-day route north of there followed CR 526 to Carrs Tavern, CR 524 in Clarksburg, municipal and minor county routes in Monmouth and Mercer Counties, and from Hightstown to Princeton what was then designated CR 539. By 1962, the designation entered Monmouth County, and by 1976, CR 571 from Hightstown to Princeton was in-place.

In the summer of 2012, NJDOT installed barriers at the Penns Neck Circle to prevent "left-turning" traffic from US 1 in either direction onto CR 571. In conjunction with other blockades of nearby intersections, this 12-week pilot program was meant to improve traffic flows along the congested US 1. Though the project was improving travel times along US 1, motorists wanting to make the previously-allowed left turns were making U-turns and K-turns in the driveways of Penns Neck residences instead of using nearby interchanges to U-turn on US 1 itself. The project ended a month early after residents complaints and local politicians opposition to the project were heard.

NJDOT has proposed a realignment of CR 571 in the Penns Neck neighborhood of West Windsor. The various alternatives would have begun near the northern terminus of Route 64 at a new grade-separated interchange to provide access to the Princeton Junction Station and the existing Washington Road, run north of Penns Neck through the David Sarnoff Research, cross US 1 at a new grade-separated interchange, and return to the existing alignment south of the Millstone River.

Major intersections

See also

References

External links

New Jersey 5xx Routes (Dan Moraseski)
New Jersey County Route 571 and NJ 64
CR 571 (Greater New York Roads)

571
571
571
571